San Juan, officially the Municipality of San Juan, formerly called as Lapog, is a 3rd class municipality in the province of Ilocos Sur, Philippines. According to the 2020 census, it has a population of 26,674 people.

Because it produces most of the goods made of buri leaf in the province, it is sometimes called the Buri Capital of Ilocos Sur.

Etymology
The town got its name from its patron saint, Saint John the Baptist.

History
The town of Lapog was established in 1772.

The name of the municipality has gone through a series of changes. The early settlers and occupants called it "Lapo", short for "Lapo-Lapo", a tall grass which grew everywhere in the area. In the year 1772, Don Tomas Aquino, the first local leader, initiated the organization of the scattered communities into one, calling the place "Lapog", a derivative of local vernacular "Lap-Lapog" which means unirrigated land. For 189 years, "Lapog" remained in the records as the official name of the town until June 18, 1961, Republic Act No. 3386 was enacted and it was renamed to San Juan. Since most of the inhabitants were of the belief that religious names bring peace, happiness, and prosperity, the town was renamed "San Juan", after the name of its patron saint, Saint John the Baptist.

It was stricken by all sorts of plagues and epidemics (like the smallpox epidemics of 1808 and 1918–19, locust infestation in 1903, and destruction of ricefields by worms called "arabas" in 1905). Bessang Pass, just south of the poblacion, was constructed in 1874.  Americans destroyed their town hall in 1903.  But despite these misfortunes, San Juan progressed into a prosperous community.

Geography

Barangays
San Juan is politically subdivided into 32 barangays. These barangays are headed by elected officials: Barangay Captain, Barangay Council, whose members are called Barangay Councilors. All are elected every three years.

Climate

Demographics

In the 2020 census, San Juan had a population of 26,674.

Economy

Government
San Juan, belonging to the first congressional district of the province of Ilocos Sur, is governed by a mayor designated as its local chief executive and by a municipal council as its legislative body in accordance with the Local Government Code. The mayor, vice mayor, and the councilors are elected directly by the people through an election which is being held every three years.

Elected officials

See also
List of renamed cities and municipalities in the Philippines

References

External links
Act renaming the Municipality of Lapog to San Juan
Pasyalang Ilocos Sur
Lapog ... our town, our home
Lapoguenio Perspectives
Philippine Standard Geographic Code
Philippine Census Information
Local Governance Performance Management System

Municipalities of Ilocos Sur